Zeeshan Khan (born 18 October 1992) is a Pakistani first-class cricketer who plays for Federally Administered Tribal Areas.

References

External links
 

1992 births
Living people
Pakistani cricketers
Federally Administered Tribal Areas cricketers
Cricketers from Abbottabad